Falange Española de las JONS (Spanish for "Spanish Phalanx of the Committees for the National-Syndicalist Offensive", FE-JONS) is a Spanish political party registered in 1976, originating from a faction the previous Falange Española Tradicionalista y de las Juntas de Ofensiva Nacional Sindicalista. The word  is Spanish for phalanx. Members of the party are called Falangists. The main ideological bases of the party are national syndicalism, Third Position and ultranationalism.

History
After the death of dictator Francisco Franco in 1975, and coinciding with the period known as the Spanish Transition, a destabilization campaign led by some sectors of the right, trying to repeat the strategy of the 1930s, began. Originally, FE-JONS was linked with the neofascist terrorism in Spain, along with other similar groups. A prominent member of the party was linked with the 1977 Massacre of Atocha. This strategy continued in the following years, although the party also participated in elections and fully legal activities. In 1980 an "escuadrilla" (squadron) of the party killed Juan Carlos García Pérez in Ciudad Lineal, Madrid.

After the electoral defeat in the general elections of 1977, in which the candidacies openly defending neo-francoist positions gained less than the 1% of the vote, the party begun a gradual distancing from the Franco regime, highlighting the thoughts of pre-Franco falangists, like José Antonio Primo de Rivera or Ramiro Ledesma. In 1979 the Círculos Doctrinales José Antonio joined the organization, in an attempt to unite neofalangists under a single political party. The same year FE-JONS formed a coalition with Fuerza Nueva and various Carlist political organizations called National Union. The coalition gained 1 MP in the elections of that year, gaining 378,964 votes (2.11%). The party didn't participate in the 23-F coup attempt.

Raimundo Fernández-Cuesta, the "National Chief" of the party since its foundation, resigned in 1983. Diego Márquez Horrillo was elected as the new chief the same year. Since then the party fully broke with Francoism, declaring itself the successor of the original Falange Española de las JONS, and fully rejecting the "Unification Decree" of 1937.

In 1999 a sector of the party split, forming La Falange. In 2004 the small faction Falange Española Independiente (FEI) joined FE-JONS. In 2011 the organization elected a new national chief, Norberto Pedro Pico Sanabria. Pico was an ex-member of the FEI. In 2012 another small faction, Mesa Nacional Falangista, joined FE-JONS.

In March 2020, Luz Belinda Rodríguez, a member of the Parliament of Andalusia who had left Vox to become an unaffiliated legislator in January 2020, reportedly joined the Falange and vowed to bring the initiatives of FE-JONS to the Parliament of Andalusia. She then quit the Falange to found her own party.

Electoral performance

Cortes Generales

Symbols
Symbols of Francoism:
Yoke and arrows, the symbol of the Catholic Monarchs.
The blue shirt, a symbol of industrial workers.
Cara al Sol, "Facing the sun", its anthem.
A flag with red and black vertical stripes.
The Swan as a symbol of Grand Inquisitor Cisneros (1436–1517) (universitarian branch).

See also

FET-JONS
Falange Española
JONS
Falangism in Latin America
Lebanese Phalanges
National Radical Camp Falanga

Notes

External links

Falange Española de las JONS 

1976 establishments in Spain
Falangist parties
Fascist parties in Spain
National syndicalism
Political parties established in 1976
Republican parties in Spain
Spanish nationalism